Royal Dragon Vodka is a specialty vodka based in Hong Kong, and distilled in Lithuania. It was created in 2012 and features flakes of gold leaf mixed with the alcohol. There are claims that it is one of the most expensive vodkas in the world. The brand comes in several different versions, the most expensive of which comes in a hand-blown glass bottle in the shape of a dragon, and topped by an 18 karat gold pendant, encrusted with 35 diamonds. The spirit is a "small batch five-time distilled vodka". In addition to its top-of-the-line version, less expensive variants include flavored vodkas, such as lychee, chocolate, green apple, and passion fruit. Of the several varieties, two come with the 23 ct Swiss flakes of gold infused into the spirit.

References

Chinese vodkas